A blunt is a cigar which is wider than a cigarillo and not quite as wide as a Corona, generally equivalent to a petit corona while short panatellas are sometimes classified as mini-blunts. These cigars typically consist of two main parts; the inner leaf, which is similar to a cigarette rolling paper, except it is made of tobacco, and a thicker outer leaf which is rolled around the inner leaf in a spiral. In most commercially available blunts, the "leaves" are not actual tobacco leaves but rather paper made from tobacco pulp.

 
Blunts originally got their name from their "broad or rounded tip", and were named as such in the 19th century to differentiate them from other cigars with a tapered, pointed tip. Blunts are a specific size cigar that have been so popular as to have been once sold in specific vending machines. The original blunt cigar was manufactured in Philadelphia out of a single leaf outer tobacco wrapper. At the time this was the only cigar wrapped in one continuous leaf, other cigars used pieces of leaves for their outer wrapper. Tobacco leaves naturally taper at the ends. Since this cigar was rolled in one leaf the end would taper and had a round appearance (thus leading to the Blunt name). Due to the popularity of this style of cigar many other Blunts were launched into the marketplace. Brands of blunts include: Phillies, Dutch Masters, Backwoods, White Owl, Altadis marketing "Antonio Y Cleopatra", "El Producto", and "Tampa Nugget" brands, Swedish Match marketing "Game" and "Garcia Y Vega" brands, and Swisher Sweets marketing "King Edward", "Optimo", and "Pom Pom" brands. These types of cigars are commonly sold in convenience stores, gas stations, grocery stores, and drugstores, in contrast to premium cigars, which are sold in cigar shops. Blunts burn quickly like cigarettes, and some can be smoked in about five minutes, whereas a premium cigar takes an hour or so to burn. Unlike premium cigars, blunts are either already cut or have a hole in the mouth end for the smoke to go through, and so they do not need to be cut at the mouth end. Blunts are also significantly cheaper than premium cigars.

Over time the term Blunt came to describe any cigar wrapped in a single continuous leaf. However, in the 1970s a new manner of producing cigars was invented. This manner is known as spiral binding. No longer did cigars have to be rolled in a continuous single leaf but instead a continuous spiral wrap from base to tip could be employed. The basic shape of a blunt remained unchanged although the burn characteristics of a spiral wrapped cigar is not the same as a single continuous leaf. However spiral wrapping is much less expensive than using a full single tobacco leaf. Spiral wrapping gives a better seal than a single continuous leaf as overlapping can be done (much like wrapping an arm in a bandage, spiral wrapping is easier to seal than a single continuous bandage).

Individually packaged blunt leaves have been available for many years. These are tobacco leaves that because of their nature and appearance are used to roll a cigar in one continuous sheet (thus the name blunt is used). The United States Tobacco Taxation Board has classified all individual cigar wrappers as "blunts" and taxes them as roll-your-own tobacco. Many US states classify blunt wraps as tobacco and a license is required to sell them and collect tax. Canada defines a blunt wrap as "a sheet or tube made of tobacco used to roll cigarette tobacco in—similar to rolling paper". Use of these single continuous sheets is closer to the original blunts of the 19th century since it is not a spiral wrap.

See also
Blunt (cannabis cigar)

References

Cigars